John Spicer (died c. 1428), of Oxford, was an English Member of Parliament and draper.

He was a Member (MP) of the Parliament of England for Oxford in 1399, 1402 and January 1404. He had a son, John Spicer, junior.

References

14th-century births
1420s deaths

Year of birth unknown
Year of death uncertain
15th-century English people
14th-century English people
People from Oxford
Members of the Parliament of England (pre-1707)
Drapers